Złotowo  is a village in the administrative district of Gmina Stare Pole, within Malbork County, Pomeranian Voivodeship, in northern Poland.

The village has a population of 312.

References

Villages in Malbork County